Ludovic Gapenne is a Paralympian athlete from France competing mainly in category T54 sprint and middle-distance events.

Ludovic was a member of the bronze medal-winning French 4 × 100 m in the 53-54 class at the 2004 Summer Paralympics where he also competed in the 1500m and 400m.

External links
 

Paralympic athletes of France
Athletes (track and field) at the 2004 Summer Paralympics
Paralympic bronze medalists for France
Living people
Year of birth missing (living people)
Medalists at the 2004 Summer Paralympics
Paralympic medalists in athletics (track and field)
21st-century French people